In statistics and econometrics, the mean log deviation (MLD) is a measure of income inequality. The MLD is zero when everyone has the same income, and takes larger positive values as incomes become more unequal, especially at the high end.

Definition 

The MLD of household income has been defined as
 

Naturally the same formula can be used for positive variables other than income and for units of observation other than households.

Equivalent definitions are
 

where  is the mean of ln(x). The last definition shows that MLD is nonnegative, since  by Jensen's inequality.

MLD has been called "the standard deviation of ln(x)", (SDL) but this is not correct. The SDL is

 

and this is not equal to the MLD. For example, for the standard lognormal distribution, MLD = 1/2 but SDL = 1.

Related statistics 

The MLD is a special case of the generalized entropy index. Specifically, the MLD is the generalized entropy index with α=0.

References

External links 
 US Census Bureau: Mean Log Deviation (MLD)

Descriptive statistics
Income inequality metrics